Melita Limited, formerly Melita Cable, is a Maltese telecommunications company established in 1992. It is a quadruple play provider that provides cable television, mobile telephone, broadband Internet, and fixed-line telephone services.

Melita was the first company to offer high-definition television in Malta through its Melita NetBox digital set-top box, introduced in 2010.

In February 2016, the private equity investment funds Apax Partners and Fortino Capital acquired the company from previous financial investors GMT Communications Partners, MC iVenture Partners, Blackrock Communications and the Gasan Group. On 23 May 2019 Melita was acquired by EQT Partners.

In October 2019, Melita launched melita.io; a new brand dedicated to delivering Machine to Machine (M2M) and Internet of Things (IoT) connectivity to businesses across Europe. The company offers both cellular IoT as well as LoRaWAN IoT connectivity.

Melita Ltd launched a charitable foundation in 2020 with initial funding of €500,000. The Melita Foundation will be investing these funds in a range of projects focused primarily on the development of digital skills and creativity among young people in Malta and the conservation of Malta’s heritage and environment.

References

External links
 
 Melita Business: https://www.melitabusiness.com/
 Melita Data Centre: https://www.melitadatacentre.com/
 Melita.io (IoT): https://www.melita.io/
 Melita Foundation: https://www.melitafoundation.org/

Telecommunications companies of Malta
Telecommunications in Malta
Mobile phone companies of Malta
Telecommunications companies established in 1992
Cable television companies
1992 establishments in Malta